The Uganda National Records Center and Archives (UNRCA), is a government building that houses the headquarters of the Uganda National Archives and Records Centre. Prior to the completion of  this building, the national records were kept at the present day National Agricultural Research Organization (NARO) Secretariat, in the basement of a former colonial administration building in Entebbe.

Location
The coordinates of the building are: 00°19'56.0"N, 32°34'42.0"E (Latitude:0.332222; Longitude:32.578333).

Overview
The National Archives Center is administered by the Uganda Ministry of Public Service.
Prospective researchers who intend to use the archives, require clearance from the National Council for Science and Technology. The clearance certificate costs US$300 for non-Ugandans and US$50 for Ugandan academics including postgraduate students pursuing Masters and Doctoral degrees. Undergraduates attending Ugandan universities are not charged a fee, but they require written clearance from their respective universities and from the National Council for Science and Technology.

Construction
Construction of the building is progressing in phases. The construction of the first phase started in 2013 and was completed in 2015 at a cost of USh20.8 billion (US$5.8 million), using a USh20.3 billion (US$5.7 million) loan from  the International Development Association (IDA) through the World Bank. The second phase is expected to cost USh28.6 billion (US$7.9 million). About USh5 billion (US$1.2 million) is needed to enable the center operate fully. The building is being developed in phases, due to insufficient funds. China Railway Jianchang Engineering Company was the main contractor for phase I, while Mutiso Menezes International were the supervising consultants.

See also
List of tallest buildings in Kampala

References

External links
 Website of the Uganda Ministry of Public Service

Government of Uganda
Government buildings in Uganda
Buildings and structures in Kampala
Kampala Central Division
Buildings and structures completed in 2015
2015 establishments in Uganda